The South Georgia Wildcats were a professional arena football team based in Albany, Georgia. They were member of the South Division of the American Conference of Arenafootball2 (AF2).

The Wildcats joined the AF2 in 2002 as an expansion team, after the league granted an expansion franchise to Fayetteville, North Carolina. During their first 3 seasons they were known as the Cape Fear Wildcats until they relocated to Albany, Georgia in 2005. They played their home games at Albany Civic Center in Albany, Georgia.

Cape Fear Wildcats

The team began as the Cape Fear Wildcats. The Wildcats began play in the 2002 season as an expansion team in the AF2. Their home games were played at Cumberland County Crown Coliseum in Fayetteville, North Carolina. They made a splash quickly in the AF2, reeling off three straight playoff berths. The team combined to go 35–13 in their first three seasons, (21-8 at home) establishing themselves as a perennial contender. They garnered an average attendance of 4,635. However, they relocated to Albany, Georgia following the 2004 season.

The Wildcats relocated to Albany, Georgia after the 2004 season. The team retained the Wildcat nickname from its earlier years. Relocation was tough, however, as the team went a combined 6-26 its first two seasons, winning just three home games.

Final roster

Season-by-season

|-
| colspan="6" align="center" | Cape Fear Wildcats
|-
|2002 || 13 || 3 || 0 || 1st AC Atlantic || Won AC Round 1 (Richmond 57–48)Won AC Semifinal (Albany 46–30)Lost AC Championship (Florida 43–23)
|-
|2003 || 10 || 6 || 0 || 1st AC Atlantic || Lost AC Round 1 (Mohegan 50–47)
|-
|2004 || 12 || 4 || 0 || 2nd AC Northeast || Won AC Round 1 (Birmingham 54–53)Lost AC Semifinal (Wilkes-Barre/Scranton 40–37)
|-
| colspan="6" align="center" | South Georgia Wildcats
|-
|2005 || 3 || 13 || 0 || 4th AC South || --
|-
|2006 || 3 || 13 || 0 || 5th AC South || --
|-
|2007 || 10 || 6 || 0 || 2nd NC South || Won NC Round 1 (Florida 59–50) Lost NC Semifinals (Tulsa 49–28)
|-
|2008 || 12 || 4 || 0 || 1st AC South || Lost AC Round 1 (Manchester 46–42)
|-
|2009 || 11 || 5 || 0 || 2nd AC South ||Lost AC Round 1 (Kentucky 66–63)
|-
!Totals || 78 || 60 || 0
|colspan="2"| (including playoffs)
|}

References

External links
 Official website
 Cape Fear Wildcats at ArenaFan
 South Georgia Wildcats at ArenaFan

 
2005 establishments in Georgia (U.S. state)
2009 disestablishments in Georgia (U.S. state)